St. Theodore Catholic School is a private Roman Catholic school in St. Charles County, Missouri, United States.

History
St. Theodore was built in 1883 and named after Rev. Theodore Krainhardt. The still-standing "old school" was built in 1913. It had 7 classrooms, two stories, a loft, a basement (used as a cafeteria), and two stairways. Two grades shared one classroom. Some classrooms were used as administrative offices throughout the years. Later, an elevator was added.

In 2000, the school was expanded, adding 6 classrooms, a cafeteria, a teacher's lounge, an administrator's office, and a large gym.

As of the 2011–2012 school year, about 215 students attend St. Theodore with a class size of 17–30.

Works cited

External links
St. Theodore school
St. Theodore Parish Church

Private schools in St. Charles County, Missouri
Private schools in Missouri